Prairial was the ninth month in the French Republican Calendar. This month was named after the French word prairie, which means meadow. It was the name given to several ships.

Prairial was the third month of the spring quarter. It started May 20 or May 21. It ended June 18 or June 19. It follows the Floréal and precedes the Messidor.

Day name table 
Like all FRC months, Prairial lasted 30 days and was divided into three 10-day weeks called décades (decades). Every day had the name of an agricultural plant, except the 5th (Quintidi) and 10th day (Decadi) of every decade, which had the name of a domestic animal (Quintidi) or an agricultural tool (Decadi).

Conversion table

See also
Revolt of 1 Prairial Year III

External links 
Spring Quarter of Year II (facsimile)

French Republican calendar
May
June

sv:Franska revolutionskalendern#Månaderna